Jake Te Hiwi is a New Zealand rugby union player, currently playing for the  and . His preferred position is centre.

Early career
Te Hiwi attended Otago Boys' High School where he was selected for the Otago academy. He played for Otago Boys' High School alongside his brother Isaac.

Professional career
Te Hiwi was named in the  squad for the 2022 Bunnings NPC.

Te Hiwi was named in the New Zealand U20 side in 2022.

References

External links
itsrugby.co.uk Profile

Living people
New Zealand rugby union players
Rugby union centres
Otago rugby union players
Highlanders (rugby union) players